
Pułtusk County is a unit of territorial administration and local government (powiat) in Masovian Voivodeship, east-central Poland. It came into being on 1 January 1999 as a result of the Polish local government reforms passed in 1998.

As of 2019 its total population is 51,862, out of which the population of Pułtusk is 19,432 and the rural population is 32,430.

Neighbouring counties
Pułtusk County is bordered by Maków County to the north, Wyszków County to the east, Legionowo County to the south, Nowy Dwór County to the south-west, and Płońsk County and Ciechanów County to the west.

Administrative division
The county is subdivided into seven gminas (one urban-rural and six rural). These are listed in the following table, in descending order of population.

References

 
Land counties of Masovian Voivodeship